Fath-Ali Khan Qajar (‎ 1686–1726), was the Qajar chieftain of the Ashaqa-bash branch. He was a renowned military commander during the rule of the Safavid shahs Husayn and Tahmasp II. He was killed on the orders of Nader Shah in 1726.

Fat'h Ali Khan was the son of Shah Quli Khan-e Qajar Quyunlu. He was Ilkhani of the Qajar tribe and Governor of Astarabad and Semnan, 1720–1726. He was killed on the orders of Nader Shah, 11 October 1726 and was buried in Mashhad.

Fath Ali Khan's son Mohammad Hassan Khan Qajar (1722–1758) was the father of Agha Mohammad Khan and Hossein Qoli Khan Jahansouz Shah Qajar (the father of "Baba Khan," the future Fath Ali Shah Qajar).

Genealogy
Fat'h 'Ali Khan had two sons and a daughter:

 1) Mohammad Hasan Bahador Khan-e Qajar Quyunlu (b.1715-k.1758)lkhani of the Qajar tribe. Governor-General of Astarabad, and Governor of Gorgan, Mazandaran and Gilan 1747- 1759. m. (first) 1739, Jayram Begum daughter of Iskandar Khan-e Qajar Quyunlu. m. (second) Zara Khanum, sister of Muhammad Husain Khan-e Qajar Devehlu. m. (third) a lady from the Izz ud-Dinlu branch of the Qajar tribe. m. (fourth) a Kurdish lady from Astarabad. m. (fifth) a lady from Isfahan. m. (sixth) sister of Hajji Jamal Fumani, Governor of Rasht. having had issue:
i)Agha Mohammad Khan Qajar the founder of Qajar dynasty
ii) Reza Quli Khan, died in exile at Choresm, 1781.
iii) Husain Quli, Jahansuz Shah, m. his cousin H.M. Agha Bajji, Mahd-i-'Aliya. He was killed by Turkomans near Fenderesk, 22 March 1777. Had issue, three sons:
(1) Fat'h 'Ali Shah Qajar(2) Hajji Husain Quli Khan'. Governor-General of Fars 1797–1798, Governor of Semnan, Kashan 1798–1801, and of Qom 1801–1802. Rebelled against his brother and seized Isfahan in July 1801, but made his submission and pardoned after the intercession of the Mahd-i-'Aliya. Arrested, blinded and exiled to Dezashib after her death in 1802.
 (3) Mohammad Sadiq Khan
iv) Morteza Qoli Khan Qajar, born 1755. Governor-General of Astarabad in 1782. Rebelled against his half-brother Agha Mohammad Khan in 1784, but was defeated and went into exile in Russia. Entered the service of Catherine the Great. He died in exile in Khwar'azam, Russia after 1785 and was buried in Kerbala, having had issue, two sons and several daughters. According to Russian sources died in 1798 or 1800. Exist his portrait dated 1796.
v) Mustafa Quli Kan, born 1755. He had issue, twelve sons and twelve daughters.
vi) Ja'afar Quli Khan, born 1751. Governor of Isfahan 1786–1789, and of Bastam 1788–1789. Heir Presumptive to his elder brother, Agha Muhammad Khan Qajar, until his arrest in 1789. He was killed at Tehran on the orders of his brother Agha Muhammad Khan, 1790.
vii) Mahdi Quli Khan, died at Gorgan, 1784, having had issue, 2 sons.
viii) 'Abbas Quli Khan, born 1756. He died at Tehran.
ix) 'Ali Quli Khan, born 1755. exiled to Barforush. He died at Babol 1825, having had issue, a daughter.
 2) Muhammad Husain Khan, died in his youth.
 3) Begum Khanoum, married Karim Khan Zand

References

Sources 
 

Qajar tribe
Safavid generals
People executed by Safavid Iran
1686 births
1726 deaths
Grand viziers of the Safavid Empire
Safavid governors of Semnan
Safavid governors of Astarabad
Safavid governors of Mashhad
Vakils of Safavid Iran
17th-century people of Safavid Iran
18th-century people of Safavid Iran